

The Snead LRH was a proposed amphibious transport glider design for the US Navy during World War II.

Development
The LRH was a twin-hull amphibious glider capable of carrying 24 troops. Two XLRH-1 prototypes and a static test airframe were ordered in April 1942, with Bureau Numbers (BuNu) 11649/11650. Production aircraft were ordered as LRH-1 with BuNus 31586/31635, but the contract was cancelled before the first aircraft was completed.

Specifications (LRH)

See also

References

Further reading
 

LRH
1940s United States military transport aircraft
1940s United States military gliders
Low-wing aircraft
Cancelled military aircraft projects of the United States